The Ridley Plan (also known as the Ridley Report) was a 1977 report on the nationalised industries in the UK. The report was produced in the aftermath of the Heath government's being brought down by the 1973–74 coal strike. 

It was drawn up by the right-wing Conservative MP Nicholas Ridley, a founding member of the Selsdon Group of free market Conservatives. In the report he proposed how the next Conservative government could fight, and defeat, a major strike in a nationalised industry.

Ridley suggested contingency planning to defeat any challenge from trade unions:

The government should if possible choose the field of battle.
Industries were grouped by the likelihood of winning a strike; the coal industry was in the 'middle' of three groups of industries mentioned.
Coal stocks should be built up at power stations.
Plans should be made to import coal from non-union foreign ports.
Non-union lorry drivers to be recruited by haulage companies.
Dual coal-oil firing generators to be installed, at extra cost.
'Cut off the money supply to the strikers and make the union finance them'.
Train and equip a large, mobile squad of police, ready to employ riot tactics in order to uphold the law against violent picketing.

These tactics were successfully employed during the miners' strike of 1984–85, when the National Union of Mineworkers was defeated by the Conservative government of Margaret Thatcher. Thatcher was strongly influenced by other Selsdon Group members besides Ridley, such as Norman Tebbit and Alan Walters. The report had been leaked six years before by The Economist and published on 27 May 1978, but the unions, especially the NUM, showed no interest in adapting or altering their own tactics in response. 

In Ridley's view, trade union power in the UK was interfering with market forces, causing inflation, and therefore had to be checked to restore the "profitability" of the UK. He and others also saw it necessary to check union power in the aftermath of the fall of the Heath government in the face of the 1973–74 strikes.

See also
Battle of Orgreave

References
Alan Sked & Chris Cook (1993), Post-War Britain: A Political History. p. 446-47.
The Economist, 27 May 1978

External links 
 The text of The Economist article, and a link to the full Report at the Margaret Thatcher Foundation.

British trade unions history
Labour relations in the United Kingdom
1974 in the United Kingdom
1977 in labor relations